The N.Y.C. District Council of Carpenters maintains jurisdiction over carpentry, dock builder, timber man, millwright, floorcovering, specialty shops and exhibition work in the New York City area.

As of 2015 the Council oversees 7 member locals: 157, 740, 926, 45, 1556, 2287 and 2790.

Locals
Member locals include:
 Local 20 (Staten Island) – Carpenters
 * Local 17 (Bronx) – Carpenters, dissolved 2000 and members transferred to Local 608
 Local 45 (Queens) – Carpenters
 * Local 135 (Manhattan Upper East Side) – Carpenters, dissolved 2000 and members transferred to new Local 157
 Local 157 (Downtown and East Side of Manhattan) – Carpenters
 * Local 257 (Manhattan Lower East Side) – Carpenters, dissolved 2000 and members transferred to new Local 157
 * Local 608 (has been dissolved 2007 and all of its members are now transferred to Local 157)
 Local 740 (Greater NY Millwright and Machinery Erectors)
 Local 926 (Brooklyn) – Carpenters
 Local 1556 (Greater NY & NJ – Dockbuilders)
 Local 1536 (mid town manhattan NY) – Timbermen) (has been dissolved 2010). Combined with dockbuilders to form local (1556).
 * Local 2163 (Manhattan Upper West Side) – Carpenters, dissolved 1982 and members transferred to Local 608
 Local 2287 (New York City – Resilient Floor Covers)
 Local 2790 (New York City & Vicinity – Shop & Industrial)
Local 348 Carpenters Queens NY

Leadership
The most senior position since 2000 has been the Office of the Executive Secretary Treasurer; prior to that, it was the Office of President.

 12 February 2014 – Present Joseph Geiger – Elected EST
 15 May 2013 – 12 February 2014 - Steve McInnis – In role of President, appointed himself to be EST pro-tem until an election is held
 1 January 2012 – 29 April 2013 Michael Bilello – Elected EST removed by Review Officer Dennis Walsh
 10 August 2009 – 1 January 2012 - Under trusteeship
 2000 – 10 August 2009 (fired) Mike Forde – Plead guilty for Racketeering and Bribery, July 28, 2010
 1997–2000 Under UBC International trusteeship
 1991–1996 Frederick Devine – Removed from office and later charged and convicted of embezzling union funds
 1986–1991 Paschal McGuinness – Banned from holding office in NYC due to RICO Consent Decree
 1982–1986 Under UBC International trusteeship
 1978–1982 Teddy Maritas – Disappeared from the Throgs Neck Bridge, and never found, while on trial

RICO Case and Disposition
In September 1990, the US Attorney for the Southern District of New York filed a RICO lawsuit against the District Council under the leadership of Paschal McGuinness. To settle the charges, the District Council eventually agreed to a consent decree in 1993. The consent decree installed oversight over the District Council operations via Judge Haight, and also brought in the office of the Investigations and Review Officer, now called the Independent Investigator.

Vital data about Genovese influence at the Javits Convention Center was supplied in reports issued by Kenneth Conboy, a former U.S. District Court Judge, who in the early 1990s was a court-appointed investigator of the carpenters' union, and his law partner, Geoffrey S. Berman.

The period of time when Walter Mack was the II, there was a good effort made to remove corruption from the District Council operations. Walter Mack was able to conduct several investigations which led to indictments, convictions, and procedural changes. Walter Mack was forced to give up the position of II after several objections from the District Council – and being accused of being "too thorough" in his investigations. Some of his work is still being used to fight the corruption in the NYC Carpenters Union. Even though there is large oversight of the operations, corruption still exists and the leadership has again been under Federal Indictment. On June 3, 2010, Judge Haight appointed Dennis Walsh as the Review Officer, with increased powers and authority then previous investigators had. Judge Haight also removed himself from the case, as he had been moved out of the Southern District of New York court (Brooklyn) to Connecticut, and felt that the case will need a local judge.

Independent Investigator
The title of IRO or II has been held by the following individuals:
 1990–1994 Michael Armstrong
 1994–2003 Judge Kenneth Conboy
 2003–2006 Walter Mack
 2006–2010 William Callahan
 2010–      Dennis Walsh (Review Officer)

References

External links
Official Website
10 Years of Court Supervised Reform
US DOL Semiannual Report Page 79
Mobsters Unions and Feds Page 183

United Brotherhood of Carpenters and Joiners of America
1900 establishments in New York City
Trade unions established in 1900